Musabəyli (also, Musabeyli) is a village in the Fuzuli District of Azerbaijan. Liberated from Armenian occupation on 17 October 2020 by Azerbaijan army.

References 

Populated places in Fuzuli District